Rick Richmond (born 1959) is an American lawyer from California who is a former nominee to be a United States district judge of the United States District Court for the Central District of California.

Education 

Richmond earned his Bachelor of Science, cum laude, from Brigham Young University and his Juris Doctor, cum laude, from George Washington University, where he was the Senior Managing Editor of The George Washington Law Review.

Legal career 

Upon graduation from law school, Richmond served as a law clerk for Judge Harlington Wood Jr. of the United States Court of Appeals for the Seventh Circuit. He has served on the Appellate Staff of the Civil Division of the Department of Justice. He was previously a partner with Kirkland & Ellis for 17 years. He is currently a partner at Jenner & Block. He is the founding and managing partner of the firm's Los Angeles office.

Expired nomination to district court 

On August 28, 2019, President Trump announced his intent to nominate Richmond to serve as a United States district judge for the United States District Court for the Central District of California. On October 17, 2019, his nomination was sent to the Senate. President Trump nominated Richmond to the seat vacated by Judge Manuel Real, who assumed senior status on November 4, 2018. On January 3, 2020, his nomination was returned to the President under Rule XXXI, Paragraph 6 of the United States Senate. On February 13, 2020, his renomination was sent to the Senate. On January 3, 2021, his nomination was returned to the President under Rule XXXI, Paragraph 6 of the United States Senate.

Memberships 

He is a member of the Federalist Society.

References 

1959 births
Living people
20th-century American lawyers
21st-century American lawyers
Brigham Young University alumni
California lawyers
California Republicans
Federalist Society members
George Washington University Law School alumni
People associated with Kirkland & Ellis
People associated with Jenner & Block
People from Grand Junction, Colorado
United States Department of Justice lawyers